The 1979 SEC men's basketball tournament took place in Birmingham, Alabama, at the Birmingham Jefferson Convention Complex. This tournament marks the first SEC Men’s Basketball Tournament held since the event’s hiatus that started after the 1952 tournament.

The Tennessee Volunteers won the tournament championship game, and received the SEC's automatic bid to the NCAA tournament by beating the Kentucky Wildcats in a 75–69 overtime win on March 3, 1979. The tournament took place from February 28 to March 3, 1979. After the SEC tournament ended, Tennessee was ranked number 20 in the Associated Press polls.

Television coverage of the championship game was produced by The C.D. Chesley Company, who syndicated the coverage of the game regionally. C.D. Chesley was known as the pioneer in syndicated college basketball as he started production of Atlantic Coast Conference basketball telecasts in the 1950s.

Scores 
Tennessee and LSU had double byes in this tournament, so those two teams didn't play in the tournament until the semifinals on March 2.

First round
Alabama 81, Florida 64 
Kentucky 82, Mississippi 77 
Georgia 75, Mississippi State 72 
Auburn 59, Vanderbilt 53

Quarterfinals
Kentucky 101, Alabama 100 
Auburn 95, Georgia 91 (4OT)

Semifinals
Kentucky 80, #8 LSU 67 
Tennessee 75, Auburn 64

Championship game
Tennessee 75, Kentucky 69 (OT)

All-tournament team 
G - Kyle Macy, UK (MVP) 
G - Truman Claytor, UK 
F - Terry Crosby, TENN
F - Reginald King, ALA
F - John Stroud, MISS

References

SEC men's basketball tournament
1978–79 Southeastern Conference men's basketball season
Basketball competitions in Birmingham, Alabama
College basketball tournaments in Alabama
SEC Basket